Pseudohypericin is an aromatic polycyclic dione that is very closely related to hypericin. It is found most commonly in the St. John's wort family of plants, namely in Hypericum perforatum.  In preliminary studies in animal models, pseudohypericin has shown antiviral effects.  It may also contribute to the potential antidepressant effect of Hypericum perforatum extracts.

References

Chemicals in Hypericum